Henry Neville, 5th Earl of Westmorland (1525–Aug 1563) was an English peer, member of the House of Lords and Knight of the Garter.

Life
He was born in 1525, the eldest son of Ralph Neville, 4th Earl of Westmorland and his wife, Katherine Stafford. Katherine's father was Edward Stafford, 3rd Duke of Buckingham; her mother was Eleanor Percy, Duchess of Buckingham.

Henry Neville was knighted in 1544 and inherited the earldom from his father in 1550. He was made a member of the Privy Council around 1552 and ambassador to Scotland the same year. He became a Knight of the Garter and lord-lieutenant of Durham on 7 May 1552. Upon the death of Edward VI, Neville supported Mary and participated in her coronation ceremony. From January 1558 to December 1559 he was lieutenant-general of the north.

His first wife was Anne Manners, daughter of Thomas Manners, 1st Earl of Rutland. Their daughter Eleanor married William Pelham. His second wife was Jane, the daughter of Sir Roger Cholmeley; thirdly he married her sister Margaret, the widow of Sir Henry Gascoigne.

Henry Neville died in August 1563 and was succeeded by his son by Anne Manners, Charles Neville, 6th Earl of Westmorland.

References

1525 births
1563 deaths
Knights of the Garter
16th-century English nobility
Henry
Earls of Westmorland
Barons Neville of Raby